is a Japanese Theatre Director, in Kanda, Tokyo. Miyagi studied aesthetics at Tokyo University. He had a strong interest in Rakugo Japanese comic talk since his teens. He was awarded the Theatre Pasta Theatre Awards in 2007 for his excellent work in theatre.

Biography
In 1980, Miyagi created a performance group at university and started his career as a director and actor. In 1990, he founded a new theatre company, Ku Na’uka Theatre Company, in which two actors play one role.

In 1995, for the first edition of Theatre Olympics in Delphi, he presented Elektra with the Suzuki Company of Toga and Tadashi Suzuki. In 1996, the company ventured into the realm of Japanese classical theater. Tenshu-Monogatari, by Kyoka Izumi, was highly successful with audiences and toured many cities in Japan, India and Pakistan. Miyagi also presented Chushin-gura, originally written for Bunraku and Kabuki, for the 2nd edition of Theatre Olympics, held in Shizuoka.

Career
He is a member of group P4 of Japanese directors, (Yukikazu Kano, Oriza Hirata, Satoshi Miyagi, Masahiro Yasuda). As of 2011 he was the head of the International Department of Theater Interaction -Japan-, Secretary General of the BeSeTo (Beijing, Seoul, Tokyo) Theatre Festival, and the guest director of SPAC (Shizuoka Performing Arts Center ; managed by Tadashi Suzuki).

Awards
Theatre Pasta Theatre Awards, 2007

References

External links
 Ku Na'uka Theatre Company Official website
 Creativity at play

1959 births
Living people
People from Tokyo